The 53rd Directors Guild of America Awards, honoring the outstanding directorial achievements in films, documentary and television in 2000, were presented on March 10, 2001 at the Hyatt Regency Century Plaza. The ceremony was hosted by Carl Reiner. The nominees in the feature film category were announced on January 22, 2001 and the other nominations were announced starting on February 1, 2001.

Winners and nominees

Film

Television

Commercials

Robert B. Aldrich Service Award
 Robert Butler
 Tom Donovan

Franklin J. Schaffner Achievement Award
 Robert N. Van Ry

Presidents Award
 Robert Wise

Honorary Life Member
 Jack Valenti

References

External links
 

2000 film awards
2000 television awards
Directors Guild of America Awards
Direct
Direct
Directors
Direct
2001 in Los Angeles
March 2001 events in the United States